Ernald Lane (born 3 March 1836) was an Anglican priest in the late 19th century and the early part of the 20th.

He was born the son of John Newton Lane of King's Bromley, Staffordshire and educated at Balliol College, Oxford. Through his father, he was a descendant of the Lane family of Bentley, West Midlands, one of whom was Jane Lane, Lady Fisher, a heroine of the English Civil War. A fine rower who represented Oxford in the 1858 Boat Race he was ordained in 1862 and was a curate at Baldersby, Rector of Leigh, Staffordshire and then a prebendary of Lichfield Cathedral until 1888 when he became Archdeacon of Stoke.

A noted scholar, he was the Dean of Rochester from 1904 until 1913, where there is a memorial to him.

He married in 1879 Evelyn, the daughter of J. W. Philips of Heybridge, Staffordshire.

References

1836 births
British male rowers
Oxford University Boat Club rowers
Alumni of Balliol College, Oxford
Fellows of All Souls College, Oxford
Archdeacons of Stoke
Deans of Rochester
1913 deaths
English male rowers